Verviers-Theux Airfield is a public use airport located  east-northeast of Theux, Liège, Wallonia, Belgium.

See also
List of airports in Belgium

References

External links 
 Airport record for Verviers-Theux Airfield at Landings.com

Airports in Liège Province
Theux
Verviers